Fowler Knoll is a notable snow-covered knoll,  high, with an abrupt south-facing cliff, in the west-central part of the Havola Escarpment, Antarctica. It was mapped by the United States Geological Survey from surveys and U.S. Navy air photos, 1958–61, and was named by the Advisory Committee on Antarctic Names for Chief Warrant Officer George W. Fowler, US Army, a navigator on the  tractor traverse from Byrd Station to South Pole Station, December 8, 1960 to January 11, 1961. The tractor party, led by Major Antero Havola, passed a few miles northward of this knoll on December 25, 1960.

References 

Hills of Ellsworth Land